Summer of the Seventeenth Doll is a 1978 Australian television film adaptation of the play Summer of the Seventeenth Doll.

It was a filmed version of the Melbourne Theatre Company's version of the play. The MTC had performed the entire "Doll" trilogy. The performances were filmed and broadcast on Channel Seven.

References

External links
1977 Doll Trilogy at Ausstage

1978 television films
1978 films
Australian television films